Samantan Nair or more commonly Samantan (meaning "equal to" or "deemed to be"), was a generic term applied to dignify a group of sub-clans among the ruling elites and feudal lords of the Nair community in Kerala. The Samantan Nairs are members of the Kiryathil, Illathu and Swaroopathil Nair communities whose ancestors performed various Śrauta rituals (Hiranyagarbha) to achieve a higher status that enabled them to rule over the Brahmins.

Robin Jeffrey, an anthropologist, described the Samantans as, "A matrilineal caste ranking between Nayars and Kshatriyas."

Dissent

Some Samantans have objected to their grouping with the Nairs, claiming that Samantans are a different caste from the Nairs. One of them, Nilambur Thachara Kovil Mana Vikrama (Elaya Thirumalpad), filed a complaint against the Collector of Malabar (William Logan) on his refusal to enter the Samantan as a caste separate from the Nairs. Even after submitting evidence trying to prove that Samantans are a separate caste, the judge refused to act against Logan, stating that:

The judge ultimately ruled that all Samantan Nairs are merely extensions of the Kiryathil subcaste of the Nair community.

References

Social groups of India
Indian castes
Kerala society
Nair